Salisbury was an electoral district of the House of Assembly in the Australian state of South Australia from May 1970 to December 1985.

The suburb of Salisbury is currently located in the safe Labor seat of Ramsay.

Members

Election results

References

Former Members of the Parliament of South Australia

Former electoral districts of South Australia
1970 establishments in Australia
1985 disestablishments in Australia